The Little Crow River is a river of the northwest of New Zealand's South Island. It flows south from the southern end of the Wharepapa / Arthur Range to join with the waters of the Crow River. The entire length of the Little Crow River is within Kahurangi National Park.

See also
List of rivers of New Zealand

References

Rivers of the West Coast, New Zealand
Kahurangi National Park
Rivers of New Zealand